Domenica Rose Hodak (born August 20, 1991) is an American soccer midfielder and defender who last played for Washington Spirit in the National Women's Soccer League.

Early life
Hodak was raised in Sayville, New York, where she attended Sayville High School and was a two-year captain for the girls soccer squad. She was a three-time first team all-state and two-time  All-Long Island selection by Newsday. Hodak earned 2008 NYSCAA All-Region honors and was a three-time first team all-state member as well as a two-time Suffolk County Small School Player of the Year. Top Drawer Soccer named her one of the nation's top 100 recruits.

Hodak played club soccer for the Alberston Fury 90 for coach Paul Riley and helped the Fury to four State Cup championships and the 2008 Regional final. She was also a four-year member of the Region I Olympic Development Program (ODP) Team as well as a and five-time Eastern New York Olympic Development Program (ODP) and Regional Team member.

University of Maryland
Hodak attended the University of Maryland where she played for the Maryland Terrapins from 2009 to 2012. During her collegiate career, Hodak made 82 appearances playing both midfielder and defender. As a central part of the Terps' defense, she helped lead the squad to a Sweet 16 appearance in the 2011 NCAA Tournament and a second round berth in 2012. In 2012, she was named to the NSCAA Third Team All-Southeast In 2012, she was named to the Atlantic Coast Conference (ACC) All-Tournament Team.

Playing career

Club

Washington Spirit
In 2013, Hodak signed as a discovery player with the Washington Spirit for the inaugural season of the National Women's Soccer League.

References

External links
 Washington Spirit player profile
 Maryland player profile
 

Living people
1991 births
Washington Spirit players
American women's soccer players
Maryland Terrapins women's soccer players
Soccer players from New York (state)
National Women's Soccer League players
People from Sayville, New York
Women's association football defenders
Women's association football midfielders